Tall oil, also called liquid rosin or tallol, is a viscous yellow-black odorous liquid obtained as a by-product of the kraft process of wood pulp manufacture when pulping mainly coniferous trees. The name originated as an anglicization of the Swedish  ('pine oil'). Tall oil is the third largest chemical by-product in a kraft mill after lignin and hemicellulose; the yield of crude tall oil from the process is in the range of 30–50 kg / ton pulp. It may contribute to 1.0–1.5% of the mill's revenue if not used internally.

Manufacturing

In the kraft process, high alkalinity and temperature convert the esters and carboxylic acids in rosin into soluble sodium soaps of lignin, rosin, and fatty acids. The spent cooking liquor is called weak black liquor and is about 15% dry content. The black liquor is concentrated in a multiple effect evaporator and after the first stage the black liquor is about 20–30%. At this stage it is called intermediate liquor. Normally the soaps start to float in the storage tank for the weak or intermediate liquors and are skimmed off and collected. A good soap skimming operation reduces the soap content of the black liquor down to 0.2–0.4% w/w of the dry residue. The collected soap is called raw rosin soap or rosinate. The raw rosin soap is then allowed to settle or is centrifuged to release as much as possible of the entrained black liquor. The soap goes then to the acidulator where it is heated and acidified with sulfuric acid to produce crude tall oil (CTO).

The soap skimming and acidulator operation can be improved by addition of flocculants. A flocculant will shorten the separation time and give a cleaner soap with lower viscosity. This makes the acidulator run smoother as well.

Most pines give a soap yield of 5–25 kg/ton pulp, while Scots pine gives 20–50 kg/ton. Scots pine grown in northern Scandinavia give a yield of even more than 50 kg/ton. Globally about 2 mill ton/year of CTO are refined.

Composition

The composition of crude tall oil varies a great deal, depending on the type of wood used. A common quality measure for tall oil is acid number. With pure pines it is possible to have acid numbers in the range 160–165, while mills using a mix of softwoods and hardwoods might give acid numbers in the range of 125–135.

Normally crude tall oil contains rosins, which contains resin acids (mainly abietic acid and its isomers), fatty acids (mainly palmitic acid, oleic acid and linoleic acid) and fatty alcohols, unsaponifiable sterols (5–10%), some sterols, and other alkyl hydrocarbon derivates.

By fractional distillation tall oil rosin is obtained, with rosin content reduced to 10–35%. By further reduction of the rosin content to 1–10%, tall oil fatty acid (TOFA) can be obtained, which is cheap, consists mostly of oleic acid, and is a source of volatile fatty acids.

Applications
The tall oil rosin finds use as a component of adhesives, rubbers, and inks, and as an emulsifier. The pitch is used as a binder in cement, an adhesive, and an emulsifier for asphalt.

TOFA is a low-cost and vegetarian lifestyle-friendly alternative to tallow fatty acids for production of soaps and lubricants. When esterified with pentaerythritol, it is used as a compound of adhesives and oil-based varnishes. When reacted with amines, polyamidoamines are produced which may be used as epoxy resin curing agents.

References

Papermaking
Renewable resources
Vegetable oils
Fatty acids